Bang Bang or Bang Bang Bang or similar may refer to:

Food
Bang bang chicken, a Chinese dish
Bang bang shrimp, a Chinese dish

People 
 Abdul Razzaq (cricketer) (born 1979), nicknamed Bang Bang Razzaq
 Bang Bang (Dubliner) (1906–1981), eccentric elderly gentleman in Dublin known for playing cowboy in the streets
 Bang-Bang Club, four photographers active in South Africa during the Apartheid period
 Keith "Bang Bang" McCurdy (born 1985), a celebrity tattoo artist

Technology 
 Bang–bang control, a controller that switches abruptly between two states
 Bang-bang robot, or pick and place robot
 Bang bang, Australian slang for a coffee knockbox

Film, TV and entertainment  
 Bang Bang (TV channel), Albanian TV channel
 "Bang-Bang" (CSI), 2006 episode of CSI: Crime Scene Investigation
 Bang Bang (telenovela), 2005 Brazilian TV series
Bang Bang (2011 film), independent film by Byron Q
Bang Bang!, 2014 Bollywood film
Bang Bang! (play), comedy by John Cleese
Bang, Bang, It's Reeves and Mortimer, UK comedy sketch series starring Vic and Bob
 Bang Bang, a character from The Hitchhiker's Guide to the Galaxy by Douglas Adams
 Bang Bang, character in the film The Brothers Bloom
 Bang Bang, fictional band in the film Brothers of the Head
 Mobile Legends: Bang Bang, multiplayer online battle arena mobile game
 Bang! Bang! Bangkok!, TV series that aired on S4C Digidol at 11:30pm on 29 March 2003

Music 
 Bang Bang Recordings, a record label created solely to release the album Five Minutes with Arctic Monkeys

Albums 
 Bang Bang (Dal Shabet album)
 Bang Bang (Dispatch album)
 Bang Bang (Kelly Willis album)
 Bang Bang Bang (Nitty Gritty Dirt Band album), and the title song
 Bang Bang Bang (Bad Boys Blue album)
 Bang! Bang! Bang! Bang! Bang! Bang! Bang!, by Brimstone Howl

Songs
 "Bang Bang" (BA Robertson song)
 "Bang Bang" (Danger Danger song)
 "Bang Bang" (DJ Fresh song)
 "Bang Bang" (Green Day song)
 "Bang Bang" (Iggy Pop song), covered by David Bowie
 "Bang Bang" (Jessie J, Ariana Grande and Nicki Minaj song)
 "Bang Bang" (Kardinal Offishall song)
 "Bang Bang" (Lartiste song)
 "Bang Bang" (Melanie Fiona song)
 "Bang Bang" (Rita Ora and Imanbek song)
 "Bang Bang" (Squeeze song)
 "Bang Bang" (will.i.am song)
 "Bang Bang (My Baby Shot Me Down)", a song by Cher, later covered by Nancy Sinatra and Bonzo Dog Doo-Dah Band; also, Vanilla Fudge 1967
 "Bang Bang", by Dr. Dre from 2001
 "Bang Bang", by the Joe Cuba Sextet, also covered by jazz artist David Sanborn
 "Bang Bang", by K'naan from Troubadour
 "Bang Bang", by Lady Sovereign from Jigsaw
 "Bang! Bang!", by Le Tigre from From the Desk of Mr. Lady
 "Bang! Bang!", by Liz Phair from Funstyle
 "Bang Bang", by Lynyrd Skynyrd from God & Guns
 "Bang Bang", by Reks from REBELutionary
 "Bang Bang", by Story of the Year from Wolves
 "Bang Bang", by Thanh Lan
 "Bang Bang", by Young Buck from Straight Outta Cashville
 "Bang Bang (Balls of Fire)", a song by Kix from Midnite Dynamite
 "Bang, Bang (Stick 'Em Up)", a song by The Bar-Kays from Too Hot to Stop
 "Bang Bang Bang" (Big Bang song)
 "Bang Bang Bang" (Mark Ronson song)
 "Bang Bang", by Nancy Sinatra
 "Bang Bang Bang" (Selena Gomez & the Scene song)
 "Bang Bang Bang", a song by Christina Perri from lovestrong

Places 
 Bang Bang Jump Up, a hill in Queensland, Australia

See also 
 Bam Bam (disambiguation)
 Bang (disambiguation)
 Bang Bang You're Dead (disambiguation)
 Chitty Chitty Bang Bang (disambiguation)
 Kiss Kiss Bang Bang (disambiguation)